The Wiz is a Broadway musical based on The Wonderful Wizard of Oz.

The Wiz may also refer to:
The Wiz (film), the 1978 film adaptation of the Broadway musical
The Wiz (soundtrack), the soundtrack to the film
The Wiz (store), former chain of American electronics stores 
The Wiz, nickname of Jeff Farmer (footballer) (born 1977), Australian rules footballer
The Wiz, nickname of Davey Whitney (1930–2015), American college basketball head coach
The Wiz, a system by Da Vinci Systems, a digital cinema company

See also

 Wiz (disambiguation)
 WHIZ (disambiguation) (for WHIZ, Whiz and Whizz)
 Kansas City Wiz, now Sporting Kansas City